The 2016–17 Prva A Liga, known as Erste košarkaške lige by sponsorship reasons, is the 11th season of the Montenegrin Basketball League, the top tier basketball league on Montenegro. Budućnost VOLI is the defending champion.

Competition format
Nine of the eleven teams that play the league join the regular season and play a three-round robin competition where the six first qualified teams join the playoffs with the two 2016–17 ABA League teams (Budućnost Voli and Mornar). The last qualified team is relegated.

Regular season

Playoffs
Budućnost VOLI and Mornar joined directly the playoffs as they participated in the 2016–17 ABA League. The finals were played with a 1-1-1-1-1 format, playing Budućnost VOLI games 1, 3 and 5 at home.

References

External links
Montenegrin Basketball Federation official website

Prva A liga seasons
Montenegro
Prva A liga